English alternative rock band Wolf Alice has released three studio albums, four extended plays and twenty singles. The band self-released their first EP, Wolf Alice (2010). The band's second EP, Blush (2013) was released via Chess Club. The band's third EP, Creature Songs (2014) was released via Dirty Hit. The band released their debut studio album, My Love Is Cool, in 2015 via Dirty Hit. Their second studio album Visions of a Life was released under the same label in 2017. Their third studio album, Blue Weekend, was released under the same label in 2021.

Studio albums

Extended plays

Singles

Other charting songs

Notes

References

External links
 

Discographies of British artists
Alternative rock discographies